The Rich-Steeper House, at 415 S. Main St. in Centerville, Utah, was built in 1908.  It was listed on the National Register of Historic Places in 1997.

It is a one-and-a-half-story yellow brick single family residence.  Its design is transitional, between Victorian and Bungalow form;  it combines central-block-with-projecting bays and bungalow house types, and has
Neoclassical stylings.  Its front, south-facing gables have "Palladian style windows with decorative muntins in the upper sashes of the flanking windows."

References

National Register of Historic Places in Davis County, Utah
Victorian architecture in Utah
Houses completed in 1908